Eschmeyer may refer to:
 Evan Eschmeyer (born 1975), an American retired professional basketball player
 William N. Eschmeyer, an American ichthyologist
 Eschmeyer nexus, a species of fish in the  monotypic genus Eschmeyer